Hugo Blanco may refer to:

 Hugo Blanco (b. 1934), Peruvian politician
 Hugo Blanco (1940-2015), Venezuelan musician